Aglaja is a dance company and academy from Bruges, Belgium. It was founded in the late 1960s by the choreographer and teacher Jan Dewulf.

Jan Dewulf was director of several noted events, such as the 1985 visit to Belgium by Pope John Paul II. 

The repertoire is mainly (light) classical music, including Johann Sebastian Bach, Johannes Brahms, Antonín Dvořák and Ostyn, but also music such as Let It Be from The Beatles.

References

External links 

 
aglaja.be website
 
website 
 

1960s establishments in Belgium
Arts organisations based in Belgium
Contemporary dance companies
Culture in Bruges
Performing groups established in the 1960s